Adam Thomas Lewis (born 8 November 1999) is an English professional footballer who plays as a left-back for Liverpool.

Early life
Lewis was born in Liverpool, Merseyside.

Club career
Lewis signed a long-term contract with Liverpool in February 2019 and made his first-team debut on 4 February 2020 in an FA Cup fourth-round replay against Shrewsbury Town.

Lewis joined French Ligue 2 club Amiens SC on loan for the 2020–21 season. On 14 January 2021, Lewis returned to England to join League One side Plymouth Argyle on loan until the end of the season. He scored his first goal for Argyle on 19 January, in his full debut for the club.

On 10 June 2021, Lewis joined Scottish Premiership side Livingston on a season-long loan deal.

On 23 June 2022, Lewis joined EFL League Two side Newport County on loan for the duration of the 2022-23 season. He made his debut for Newport on the 6 August 2022 as a second half substitute in the 1-0 League Two defeat to Walsall. Lewis scored his first goal for Newport in the 1-1 League Two draw against Rochdale on 7 January 2023. His loan at Newport was cut short on 25 February 2023 by a season ending injury.

International career
Lewis represented the England under-16 team against Scotland in the 2014 Victory Shield. He was a member of the squad that competed at the 2018 UEFA European Under-19 Championship and later that year made his debut for the under-20 team.

Career statistics

References

External links
Profile at the Liverpool F.C. website

1999 births
Living people
Footballers from Liverpool
English footballers
England youth international footballers
Association football defenders
Liverpool F.C. players
Amiens SC players
Plymouth Argyle F.C. players
Livingston F.C. players
Newport County A.F.C. players
Ligue 2 players
English Football League players
Scottish Professional Football League players
English expatriate footballers
Expatriate footballers in France
English expatriate sportspeople in France